Juho Kinnunen (14 January 1865, Rääkkylä - 9 September 1934) was a Finnish Lutheran clergyman and politician. He was a member of the Parliament of Finland from 1924 to 1927, representing the National Coalition Party.

References

1865 births
1934 deaths
People from Rääkkylä
People from Kuopio Province (Grand Duchy of Finland)
20th-century Finnish Lutheran clergy
National Coalition Party politicians
Members of the Parliament of Finland (1924–27)
University of Helsinki alumni
19th-century Finnish Lutheran clergy